The 1925 Auburn Tigers football team was an American football team that represented Auburn University as a member of the Southern Conference during the 1925 season. In its first season under head coach Dave Morey, Auburn compiled a 5–3–1 record (3–2–1 against conference opponents), finished ninth in the conference, and was outscored by a total of 114 to 81. The team played its home games at Drake Field in Auburn, Alabama (two games), Rickwood Field in Birmingham, Alabama (one game), and the Cramton Bowl in Montgomery, Alabama (one game).

Schedule

References

External links 

 

Auburn
Auburn Tigers football seasons
Auburn Tigers football